Iraj Nazerian (March 5, 1939 in Tehran, Iran – September 17, 1991 in Sweden) was an Iranian dubber who is known for Persian voice-dubbing foreign films. He is known for dubbing over Orson Welles role as Charles Foster Kane from Citizen Kane and has also dubbed over some of Marlon Brando, Charles Bronson, Gene Hackman, Toshiro Mifune and Lino Ventura's voice roles in films they starred in. He has also dubbed over Davoud Rashidi's role as Six-fingered Mofatesh from the Hezar Dastan.

Dubbing voice roles

References 
http://www.yazdfarda.com/news/1392/06/75184.html

http://7faz.com/Subject.aspx?Id=1197&T=1

بیوگرافی ایرج ناظریان

1939 births
1991 deaths
Iranian male voice actors
Male actors from Tehran